is a Japanese manga artist from Satte, Saitama, Japan. He is best known as the creator of Lucky Star which began serialization in Kadokawa Shoten's Comptiq magazine in December 2003. The series had been on hiatus since 2014. On September 2, 2022, it was announced that Lucky Star would make a return. It began again on November 10, 2022. He is also credited for creating Comptiq's mascot character .

Yoshimizu also works under the pen name .

Biography
Yoshimizu was born on 1977 in Satte, Saitama, Japan. He attended Kasukabe Kyōei High School, a private academy in the city of Kasukabe, where he graduated as part of the 14th graduating class.

From the time he was in junior high school, Yoshimizu enjoyed drawing, and in high school he began drawing manga featuring his classmates. While a member of the animation club in high school, he began seriously drawing manga and doing illustration work. After graduating from high school, he began attending a technical school and working as a graphic artist and working toward becoming a manga artist.

Around that time, Yoshimizu met Gō Katō, who later became an editor—and then editor-in-chief—at Comptiq. Katō appears in the Lucky Star manga series as the rabbit "Editor K". After that, Yoshimizu got commission work to do spot illustrations and stories in anthology comic releases, in addition to doing original manga stories to fill out empty spots in the magazine when manga series completed.

One of the original series he created was Lucky Star, which became popular and was subsequently picked up as a regular series. Lucky Star currently runs in Comptiq.

There had been some confusion as to Yoshimizu's gender due to one of the main characters of Lucky Star—who is also named "Kagami"—being female, so Yoshimizu made it clear he was male in September 2007 at "Lucky Star Autumn Festival" Autograph session in Akihabara. While on a signing trip to Taiwan, he was proposed to by a male twice. In volume 6 of the manga he apologized, stating he likes females.

Works

Original illustration
 (Penguin Works, Windows 95/98, as Tsukasa Suina)
 (Frau)
Lucky Star: Ryōō Gakuen Ōtōsai (Kadokawa Shoten, PlayStation 2, original design, general supervision, main character paste-up images)

Manga
 (in Bessatsu Comic Comp, not yet collected in tankōbon format)
Lucky Star (in Comptiq, Kadokawa Shoten)
Two series-within-a-series have also been published: 
 (in Comp Ace)
 (in Comptiq)
Shuffle! (Comic A la Carte, one volume, yonkoma comic anthology)
 (Character design, illustration and commercial four-panel comic strip, etc...)
 (in Comptiq)

Novel illustration
 (as Tsukasa Suina, written by Izumi Morino, March 2003)
 (written by Tōka Takei, August 2007)
 (written by Tōka Takei, March 2008)
 (written by Tōka Takei, October 2008)
 (written by Touko Machida, April 2009)
 (created by Kenjiro Hata, with illustrations by Toshihiko Tsukiji, Shōtarō Mizuki, Teru Arai, and Takafumi Nanatsuki, August 2009)
 (cover illustration, by Friedrich Nietzsche, Kadokawa Shoten, 2011)
 (written by Heisei Izu and Kei Tanaka, February 2012)

Anime
 Maesetsu! (Original character design)

References

External links
 

1977 births
Japanese illustrators
Living people
Manga artists from Saitama Prefecture
Satte, Saitama